Anthony DeVito (born January 20, 1972) is an American professional wrestler. He is best known for his appearances with the World Wrestling Federation, Extreme Championship Wrestling and Ring of Honor.

Professional wrestling career

Early career (1991-1992) 
DeVito was trained by David Schultz and debuted in 1991.

World Wrestling Federation (1992–1997) 
In 1992, DeVito was signed by the World Wrestling Federation to a contract. DeVito debuted for the WWF in 1992 and worked as an enhancement talent for the company, losing to the likes of Mr. Perfect, Bam Bam Bigelow, Doink the Clown and Phantasio. After leaving the company in 1996, he began working on the independent circuit.

Independent circuit (1997–1999) 
In the late 1990s, DeVito appeared with promotions in the Northeastern United States such as Jersey All Pro Wrestling and Northeast Wrestling.

Extreme Championship Wrestling (1999–2001) 
In 1999, DeVito joined Extreme Championship Wrestling as a part of a faction called "Da Baldies" with Angel, Vito Lograsso, P. N. News, Vic Grimes and Redd Dogg. The characteristics of Da Baldies were that of bald headed thugs. DeVito and Angel feuded with Balls Mahoney and Axl Rotten and then New Jack. At Guilty as Charged, Da Baldies were "hired" to attack the team of Christian York and Joey Matthews, as well as Justin Credible and Steve Corino. After ECW declared bankruptcy in April 2001, DeVito began wrestling on the independent circuit again, most prominently for Ring of Honor.

Ring of Honor (2002–2005)

On April 27, 2002, DeVito formed a tag team with his longtime friend Loc known as "The Carnage Crew". The Carnage Crew was later expanded to include Masada, and then again to include Justin Credible. Credible left ROH in 2004, while Masada became a villain by betraying DeVito and Loc on May 22, 2004.

DeVito and Loc feuded with Special K, then with Dan Maff and B. J. Whitmer. After Maff left ROH, they began feuding with Whitmer and his new partner, Jimmy Jacobs. The Carnage Crew defeated Whitmer and Jacobs for the Tag Team Championship on July 9, 2005, but lost it to Whitmer and Jacobs on July 23.

Late career (2005–present) 
DeVito left Ring of Honor in June 2005 and went into semi-retirement, making occasional appearances on the independent circuit.

DeVito made two appearances with World Wrestling Entertainment (formerly the World Wrestling Federation) in mid-2006. On the June 20, 2006 episode of ECW on Sci Fi, DeVito appeared as Macho Libre (a parody reference to both Jack Black's titular character from the film Nacho Libre and "Macho Man" Randy Savage), losing to The Sandman in a squash match. On the July 4 episode of ECW on Sci Fi, DeVito reappeared as a faux preacher who verbally rallied against ECW until being attacked and chased from ringside by The Sandman.

Personal life 
DeVito is married with two children and they live together in New Windsor, New York. He has also trained many wrestlers throughout the years, including Bobby Fish. On November 15, 2016, DeVito opened his own wrestling school.

Championships and accomplishments 
Assault Championship Wrestling
ACW Great American Championship (1 time)
Eastern States Wrestling
ESW Light Heavyweight Championship (1 time)
Go Wrestling
GW Powerweight Championship (1 time)
Massachusetts Wrestling Association
MWA Tag Team Championship (1 time) - with Nick Barberi
Millennium Wrestling Association
MWA Hardcore Championship (1 time)
NEWF
NEWF Television Championship (1 time)
New Breed Wrestling
NBW Tag Team Championship (1 time) – with Big Guido
NBW Television Championship (1 time)
NBW United States Championship (1 time)
NWA Northeast
NWA Northeast Television Championship (1 time)
Renegade Wrestling Federation
RWF Heavyweight Championship (1 time)
Ring of Honor
ROH Tag Team Championship (1 time) – with HC Loc

References

External links 
 
 

1972 births
American male professional wrestlers
American professional wrestlers of Italian descent
Living people
People from Newburgh, New York
Professional wrestlers from New York (state)
ROH World Tag Team Champions